Kim Daniela Pavlin (born 25 April 1992) is a Croatian swimmer. At the 2012 Summer Olympics, she competed in the Women's 200 metre backstroke, finishing in 33rd place overall in the heats, failing to qualify for the semifinals.

Personal life
Kim Daniela Pavlin is married to Evan Nathaniel Wasser.

References

Croatian female swimmers
1992 births
Living people
Olympic swimmers of Croatia
Swimmers at the 2012 Summer Olympics
Female backstroke swimmers
21st-century Croatian women